Arthur Mahoney (19 July 1904 — 3 August 1985), born in Boston, was a ballet, modern, jazz, flamenco, and 18th century court dancer.

Mahoney was inspired to become a ballet dancer upon seeing a magazine cover photo of Vaslav Nijinsky in the role of "Le Spectre de la rose." He then moved to New York in 1923 to study ballet with Luigi Alberteri, ballet master at the Metropolitan Opera, where he received his first professional engagement that lasted three seasons. He made his debut as soloist in 1926, in “La Vestale” by Gaspare Spontini.

Paris 1928–29, Mahoney studied with Bronislava Nijinska and joined Ida Rubenstein's Ballet company. At this time he met his future wife Thalia Mara, who was studying ballet with Olga Preobrajenska and Nikolai Legat.

In 1935, Mahoney joined the faculty of the Juilliard School as its Dance Director and choreographer.

In 1944, Mahoney and Thalia Mara, founded and became artistic directors of the School of Dance Arts located in the Carnegie Hall Studios.

In 1947, Mahoney and Thalia Mara became managing directors at Jacob’s Pillow during Ted Shawn's leave of absence. They created a resident dance company, “Ballet Repertory” with a group of approximately 18 dancers of equal status. Having lost their studio at Carnegie Hall that year, they moved it to 117 West 54th Street. Mahoney gave dance and movement coaching sessions to singers from the Metropolitan Opera, notably Lily Pons and Risë Stevens. Mahoney moved to California c1963.

In 1978, after 15 years of separation, Mahoney joined Mara in Jackson, Mississippi, where she was Director of "The Jackson Ballet." Mahoney became teacher and coach of the company's male dancers.

Performances (selection)

References

Arthur Mahoney, 81, Dancer And Former Texas Cowhand, The New York Times (Obituary) (5 August 1985). Retrieved August 1, 2020.
DeMers, John. Arthur Mahoney Tells of his Fantastic Career, UPI ARCHIVES (5 September 1982). Retrieved August 1, 2020.
Plan For Experimental Theatre Explained: Arthur Mahoney and Thalia Mara, The New York Times (19 January 1947). Retrieved August 1, 2020.
Dunning, Jennifer. Thalia Mara, 92, Ballet Educator, The New York Times (Obituary) (11 October 2003). Retrieved May 12, 2022.
Kavanaugh, Julie. Secret Muses—The Life of Frederick Ashton. (New York: Pantheon Books):97-98. 1996

1904 births
1985 deaths
20th-century American dancers